Anacanthella is a genus of flies in the family Stratiomyidae.

Species
Anacanthella angustifrons (Hardy, 1932)
Anacanthella splendens Macquart, 1855

References

Stratiomyidae
Brachycera genera
Taxa named by Pierre-Justin-Marie Macquart
Diptera of Australasia